The Tag-Along 2 is a 2017 Taiwanese horror film directed by Cheng Wei-hao. It is a sequel to The Tag-Along (2015), which is adapted from the well-known Taiwanese urban legend, "The Little Girl in Red". 
The film stars Rainie Yang, Hsu Wei-ning, Francesca Kao, Lung Shao-hua and River Huang. It was released  on August 25, 2017.

The film was a commercial success, grossing NT$105 million domestically against its NT$45 million budget.

Synopsis 
When social worker Li Shu-fen discovers that her pregnant teenage daughter Ya-ting has disappeared, her search for Ya-ting ends her with many horrifying mysteries. She blames Ya-ting's boyfriend Lin Chun-kai, who works as a shaman-in-training and vessel for a benevolent spirit called the “Tiger Lord”, for Ya-ting's pregnancy.

Meeting the mysterious Lin Mei-hua, who imprisons her own daughter inside her house covered with papers written with spells and encountering the missing and pregnant Shen Yi-chun in an abandoned hospital. It is revealed that the girl in red is Mei-hua's daughter who died tragically in a roller-coaster accident. Mei-hua used black magic to resurrect her but only for a demon to possess her daughter, making her the infamous girl in red. After the red girl wrecked havoc on the mountain by killing an unsuspecting hiker, Mei-hua decided to trap her using a big talisman cloth to cover her body and buried her in the mountain. However, a group illegal loggers accidentally untombed her and enabled her to wreck havoc once again.

Shu-fen, Mei and Yi-chun decide to end the curse permanately and fight the red girl. Mei-hua is killed but Shu-fen manages to reach her daughter and saves her. Mei-hua's youngest daughter confronts her deceased older sister and reveals her mother love for her, causing the red girl to banish the demon inside her and her soul finally passes on to the afterlife to rest in peace. As her soul is finally put to rest, the curse in the mountain vanishes.

After properly burying Mei-Hua and her daughter, Yi-chun adopts the red girl's sister and Shu-fen attends her daughter's delivery, warmly welcoming her grandchild.

Cast 
 Rainie Yang as Li Shu-fen
 Hsu Wei-ning as Shen Yi-chun
 Francesca Kao as Lin Mei-hua 
 Lung Shao-hua as Master Long 
 River Huang as Ho Chih-wei
 Wu Nien-hsuan as Lin Chun-kai (Tiger Lord)
 Ruby Chan as Li Ya-ting
 Frankie Huang as Chang Ming-hao

Soundtrack

Release 

The film released its promotional poster and stills at the 2017 Hong Kong International Film & TV Market (Filmart) held during the Hong Kong International Film Festival. At Filmart, the film sold distribution rights to more than 19 regions, which is triple the number for the original The Tag-Along.

The film was released in the U.S. and Canada on September 22, 2017. It was screened at the Sitges Film Festival in Spain in October 2017.

Box office 
Three weeks after its release in Taiwan on August 25, 2017, The Tag-Along 2 became the top domestic box office hit in 2017.

By September 11, 2017, the film earned NT$92 million, out-grossing its predecessor (NT$85 million) in domestic takings to become the highest-grossing local horror film of the past decade. As of October 3, 2017, The Tag-Along 2 has grossed NT$104 million in Taiwan.

Awards and nominations

See also
 Mo-sin-a

References

External links
 
 

Taiwanese-language films
2017 horror films
Taiwanese horror thriller films
Taiwanese sequel films
2017 horror thriller films
Films based on urban legends
2010s Mandarin-language films